This is a list of notable Jamaican British people.

Academia 

 Kehinde Andrews (born 1983), Professor of Black Studies at Birmingham City University. He is the first black studies professor in the UK and led the establishment of the first black studies programme in Europe, at Birmingham City. Activist and author. Director of the Centre for Critical Social Research; founder of the Harambee Organisation of Black Unity; and co-chair of the Black Studies Association
 Robert Beckford (born 1965), Professor of Black Theology at the Queen's Foundation, Birmingham
 Aggrey Burke (born 1943), President of the Transcultural Psychiatry Society. Vice-chair and a trustee of the George Padmore Institute. Britain's first black consultant psychiatrist, appointed by the National Health Service (NHS)
 Nira Chamberlain (born 1969), President of the Institute of Mathematics and its Applications. He is the first black mathematician to feature in the biographical reference book Who’s Who
 Patricia Daley, Vice Principle of Jesus College, Cambridge and Professor of Human Geography of Africa at the University of Oxford and a Fellow of Jesus College, Oxford
 Len Garrison (died 2003), educationalist, historian and community activist. He set up ACER (Afro-Caribbean Education Resource) and co-founded the Black Cultural Archives
 Kei Miller (born 1978), Professor of Creative Writing at the University of Exeter. Poet, fiction writer, essayist and blogger
 Donald Palmer (1962), Senior Lecturer in Immunology in the Comparative Biomedical Sciences Department of the Royal Veterinary College, London
 Geoff Palmer (born 1940), Chancellor of Heriot-Watt University. Palmer became Scotland's first black university professor in 1989
 Winsome Pinnock (born 1961), Visiting Lecturer at Royal Holloway College and Senior Visiting Fellow at the University of Cambridge. Playwright
 Leone Ross (born 1969), Senior Lecturer in the Creative Writing department at Roehampton University. Senior Fellow of the UK Higher Education Academy. Novelist, short story writer, editor and journalist 
 Tony Sewell (born 1959), Educational consultant and chair of the Commission on Race and Ethnic Disparities
 Shirley Thompson, Professor of Music at the University of Westminster

Activism and politics
 Diane Abbott (born 1953), Labour MP since 1987. Abbott is Britain’s first black female Member of Parliament, the first black female Shadow Home Secretary and the longest-serving black MP in the House of Commons
Shaun Bailey (born 1971), politician and former journalist
 Frances Batty Shand (died 1885), early charitable activist
Dawn Butler (born 1963), Labour MP since 2015. Butler became the first black woman to speak from the despatch box in the House of Commons in December 2009
Betty Campbell (died 2017), Welsh community activist and Wales' first black head teacher
Janet Daby (born 1970), politician
Barbara Follett (born 1942), politician
Henry Gunter (died 2007), civil rights campaigner, trade unionist and the first black delegate to be elected to the Birmingham Trades Council
Roy Hackett (died 2022), civil rights campaigner
Stuart Hall (died 2014), cultural theorist and political activist. Co-founder of New Left Review He was voted one of the 100 greatest black Britons
Paulette Hamilton, a member of the Labour Party and Birmingham's first black MP
Darren Henry (born 1968), politician  
Lee Jasper (born 1958), politician and activist. He served as Senior Policy Advisor on Equalities to the Mayor of London
 Sam Beaver King (died 2016), campaigner and Southwark's first black Mayor
David Kurten, (born 1971), politician
Baroness Lawrence (born 1952), campaigner
Harold Moody (died 1947), physician and campaigner who established the League of Coloured Peoples in 1931
Olive Morris (died 1979)  community leader and activist in the feminist, Black nationalist, and squatters' rights campaigns
Bill Norris (born 1938), General Secretary of the Transport and General Workers' Union from 1992 to 2003, the first black leader of a major British trade union  He was voted one of the 100 greatest black Britons
Marvin Rees (born 1972), politician who has served as the Mayor of Bristol. He is the UK’s first directly elected black mayor
Patrick Roach (born 1965), NASUWT General Secretary
Louis Stedman-Bryce (born 1974), property investor and former politician
Patrick Philip Vernon (born 1961), Labour councillor, chair of the Labour Party's Race Equality Advisory Group and political activist
 James (Jim) Alexander Williams, first (ceremonial) black Lord Mayor of Bristol

Business and law 

 Jak Beula (born 1963), entrepreneur, cultural activist. The founder and chief executive of the Nubian Jak Community Trust
 Dyke, Dryden and Wade, Britain's first black multi-million-pound business enterprise
 Wilfred Emmanuel-Jones (born 1957), businessman, farmer, and founder of "The Black Farmer" range of food products
 Michael Fuller (born 1959), Chief Inspector of the Crown Prosecution Service and Britain's first black Police Chief Constable
 Emma Grede (born 1982), co-founder and CEO of Good American, a founding partner of Skims, and co-founder of Safely
 Chris Hohn (born 1966), billionaire and hedge fund manager
 Eric Irons (died 2007), Britain's first black magistrate
 Neil Kenlock (born 1950), media professional. Co-founder of Choice FM, the UK’s first and only licensed, independent black music radio station. Co-founder of the first black British glossy magazine, Root
 Val McCalla (died 2002), accountant and media entrepreneur. He was the founder of The Voice, a British weekly newspaper aimed at the Britain's black community
 Pat McGrath (born 1965), founder of Pat McGrath Labs which has an estimated value of  $1 billion
 Jacqueline McKenzie, human rights lawyer
 Alexander McLean (born 1985), lawyer and founder of Justice Defenders
 Heather Melville (born 1962), corporate and international banker
 Caroline Newman (born 1963), first black solicitor to be elected to the Council of the Law Society of England and Wales. Also an author, entrepreneur and diversity advocate
 Nathanial Peat, entrepreneur and international motivational speaker
 Heather Rabbatts (1955), solicitor, businesswoman and broadcaster. She served as a Football Association director from 2011 to 2017 and was the first ethnic minority person to do so and the only woman on the board. Also appointed Chief executive of Merton before serving as Chief executive of the London Borough of Lambeth. She became the youngest council chief in the country.
 Levi Roots (born 1958), businessman, TV personality and founder of "Reggae Reggae sauce"
 Shaun Wallace (born 1960), barrister, lecturer, TV personality. He is one of the six "chasers" on the ITV quiz show The Chase. He won Mastermind in 2004
 Dame Sharon White (born 1967), businesswoman and Second Permanent Secretary at HM Treasury from 2013 to 2015. She became the first black person, and the second woman, to become a Permanent Secretary at the  HM Treasury
 Jacky Wright, Chief digital officer and a corporate vice president at Microsoft US

Entertainment
 Josie d'Arby (born 1972), actress, TV presenter and painter. In 1999, she became the youngest British woman to host her own chat show
 Akala (born 1983), rapper
 Aml Ameen (born 1985), actor
 Samuel Anderson (born 1982), actor
 Ella Balinska (born 1996), actress (Jamaican mother, Polish father)
 Les Ballets Nègres, Europe's first black dance company, founded in 1946 by Jamaican dancers Berto Pasuka and Ritchie Riley
 Sheyla Bonnick, singer-songwriter, performer, co-producer, fashion designer, author, inventor
 Gabrielle Brooks (born 1990), actress
 Errol Brown (died 2015), singer-songwriter, best known as the frontman of the soul and funk band Hot Chocolate
 Simona Brown (born 1994), actress
 Keisha Buchanan (born 1984), Sugababes founding member, singer
 Alexandra Burke (born 1988), singer-songwriter and actress
 Mahalia Burkmar (born 1998), singer-songwriter
 Celeste (born 1994), soul singer
 Chip (born 1990), rapper
 Lloyd Coxsone (born c. 1945), sound system operator and record producer
 Doña Croll, actress
 Olivia Dean (born 1999), singer
 Michelle de Swarte, comedian, presenter, actress, former model
 Alesha Dixon (born 1978), rapper, singer-songwriter, dancer, TV personality, and author
 Stefflon Don (born 1991), rapper, singer
 Omari Douglas (born 1994), actor
 Sharon Duncan-Brewster, actress
 Leonie Elliott (born 1988), actress
 Jade Ewen (born 1988), singer, actress and former member of the girl group Sugababes
 Rebecca Ferguson (born 1986), singer
 Giggs (born 1983), Grime MC
 Mo Gilligan (born 1988), comedian
 Andrew Gourlay, conductor
 Stephen Graham (born 1973), actor
 Jackie Guy, dancer, choreographer and teacher
 Alison Hammond (born 1975), TV personality, actress
 Mona Hammond (born 1931), actress
 Ainsley Harriott (born 1957), chef and TV presenter
 Naomie Harris (born 1976), actress
 Lenny Henry, comedian
 Kirby Howell-Baptiste, actress
 Marvin Humes (born 1985), singer, disc jockey, TV presenter and radio host 
 Rochelle Humes (born 1989), singer and presenter
 Jamelia (born 1981), singer-songwriter and TV presenter
 Diane Louise Jordan (born 1960), actress, TV and radio presenter. She was the first black presenter of the children's television programme Blue Peter
 Janet Kay (born 1958), singer, songwriter and actress
 Erin Kellyman (born 1998), actress
 Malachi Kirby (born 1989), actor
 Beverley Knight (born 1973), recording artist and musical theatre actress 
 Lianne La Havas (born 1989), singer-songwriter and record producer 
 Cleo Laine (born 1927), singer and actress. Grammy Award winner and voted one of the 100 greatest black Britons 
 Tamara Lawrance, actress
 Rustie Lee (born 1949), TV personality, TV chef, actress, singer and former politician
 Adrian Lester (born 1968), actor 
 Don Letts (born 1956), film director, DJ and musician 
 Shaznay Lewis (born 1975), singer-songwriter and actress 
 Delroy Lindo (born 1952), actor
 Judi Love (born 1980), comedian
 Lashana Lynch (born 1987), actress
 M1llionz, rapper
 Mad Lion, British rapper/Reggae performer singer
 Madeleine Mantock, actress
 Ella Mai, singer-songwriter. Grammy winner
 Bob Marley, influential singer-songwriter
 Jo Martin, actress
 Dominique Moore (born 1986), performer
 Ms. Dynamite (born 1981), singer-songwriter and record producer
 Nao (born 1987), singer-songwriter and record producer 
 Aaron Pierre (born 1994), actor
 Courtney Pine (born 1964), jazz musician, voted one of the 100 greatest black Britons
 Leigh-Anne Pinnock (born 1991), singer
 Jessica Plummer (born 1992), actress
 Maxi Priest (born1961), singer-songwriter
 Paulette Randall (born 1961), theatre director 
 Slick Rick, British rapper, producer
 Colin Salmon (born 1961), actor, director and executive producer
 Jorja Smith (born 1997), singer
 Karla-Simone Spence, actress
 Neville Staple (born 1955), singer
 Amarah-Jae St. Aubyn (born 1994), actress
 Steel Pulse, reggae band. Grammy Award winners
 Antonia Thomas (born 1986), actress
 Marsha Thomason (born 1976), actress
 Carroll Thompson, singer, best known as the “Queen of Lovers Rock”
 Ruby Turner (born 1958), singer-songwriter, and actress
 FKA Twigs (born 1988), singer-songwriter, producer, and dancer
 Micheal Ward (born 1997), actor
 Jamael Westman (born 1991), actor
 Caron Wheeler (born 1963), singer-songwriter. Grammy Award winner
 Willard White (1946), operatic bass baritone
 Ricky Whittle (born 1981), actor
 Kedar Williams-Stirling (born 1994), actor
 Layton Williams (born 1994), actor and singer
 Luke Youngblood (born 1986), actor

Fashion designers and models 

 Leomie Anderson (born 1993), model and fashion designer. The first black British Victoria's Secret Angel
 Munroe Bergdorf (born 1987), model and activist. The first transgender model in the UK for L'Oréal
 Naomi Campbell (born 1970), supermodel and actress. The first black model to appear on the front cover of Time, French Vogue, Russian Vogue and the September issue of American Vogue
 Nicholas Daley, fashion designer
 Jourdan Dunn (born 1990), supermodel and actress. The first black British model to enter the Forbes model rich list
 Bruce Oldfield (born 1950), fashion designer
 Tessa Prendergast (died 2001), fashion designer, actress and socialite. Designer of the taboo-breaking white bikini worn by Ursula Andress in the 1962 film Dr. No
 Martine Rose (born 1980), menswear designer
 Bianca Saunders, fashion designer. Winner of the ANDAM Fashion Award for young talent
 Grace Wales Bonner (born 1992), fashion designer

Inventors 

 Jak Beula (born 1963), inventor of the multi-award-winning board game, Nubian Jak
 Nira Chamberlain (born 1969), creator of a mathematical cost capability trade-off model for HMS Queen Elizabeth and the inventor of a long multiplication method used in some UK schools
 Geoff Palmer (born 1940), inventor of the barley abrasion process, a patented technique that speeds up the production of malt from grain and which is used by the British brewing industry

Religion 
 Rev Rose Hudson-Wilkin (born 1961), Bishop of Dover and the first black female to become a Church of England bishop. She was also the first woman and the first black person to serve as Chaplain to the Speaker of the House of Commons. She also held the role of Queen's Chaplain.
 Oliver Lyseight, the founder of one of Britain's largest black majority churches, and spiritual leader to the Windrush generation

Sports 
 Viv Anderson (born 1956), retired footballer and coach. One of the first black football players to represent England in a full international match
 Michail Antonio (born 1990), footballer
 John Barnes (born 1963), retired footballer
 Daniel Bell-Drummond (born 1993), cricketer
 Darren Bent (born 1984), retired footballer
 Luther Blissett (born 1958), retired footballer
 Frank Bruno (born 1961), retired professional boxer
 Frazier Campbell (born 1987) footballer
Sol Campbell (born 1974), retired footballer and manager
 Mark Chamberlain (born 1961), retired footballer
 Neville Chamberlain (born 1960), retired footballer
 Linford Christie (born 1960), retired sprinter
Andy Cole (born 1971), retired footballer
Garth Crooks (born 1958), retired footballer and pundit. Elected as the first black chairman of the Professional Footballers’ Association
Laurie Cunningham (died 1989), the first ever British player to sign for Real Madrid
Tasha Danvers (born 1977), athlete
 Bobby Decordova-Reid (born 1993), footballer
 Lloyd "Lindy" Delapenha (died 2017), the first black footballer to win a championship medal
 Clayton Donaldson (born 1984), footballer
 Desmond Douglas (born 1955), table tennis player
 Leon Edwards (born 1991), professional mixed martial artist
Dame Jessica Ennis-Hill (born 1986), retired track and field athlete
 Chris Eubank (born 1966), retired professional boxer
 Demarai Gray, footballer
 Mason Greenwood, footballer
 Jeremy Guscott (born 1965), retired rugby union player
 Ellery Hanley (born 1961), retired rugby league player and coach
 Audley Harrison (born 1971), retired professional boxer
 David Haye (born 1980), boxer
 Michael Hector (born 1992), footballer
 Mason Holgate, footballer
 Dame Kelly Holmes (born 1970), middle-distance runner and Olympic gold medallist
 Colin Jackson (born 1967), retired hurdler
 David James (born 1970), retired professional footballer and goalkeeper
 Aaron Lennon (born 1987), footballer
 Jack Leslie (died 1988), footballer
 Denise Lewis (born 1972), retired track and field athlete, sports presenter
 Lennox Lewis (born 1965) retired professional boxer
 Devon Malcolm (born 1963), retired cricketer
 Adrian Mariappa (born 1986), footballer
 Ovill McKenzie (born 1979), retired professional boxer
Ishmael Miller, footballer
 Wes Morgan (born 1984), footballer
 Ravel Morrison (born 1993), footballer
 Alex Oxlade-Chamberlain (born 1993), footballer
 Christian Oxlade-Chamberlain (born 1998), footballer
 Michael Page (born 1987), professional boxer and mixed martial artist; mother was from Jamaica
 Jimmy Peters (born 1879), the first black man to play rugby union for England
 Nathan Redmond, footballer
 Jason Robinson (born 1974), rugby international, the first black captain of the England national rugby union team. Also the first former professional rugby league player to captain the England rugby union team
 Danny Rose (born 1990), footballer
 Ralph Rowe, (died 2013), Britain's first black Paralympian
 Tessa Sanderson  (born 1956), athlete, the first and only British woman to win gold at an Olympic throwing event, and the first black British woman ever to win Olympic gold
 Alex Scott (born 1984), sports presenter, pundit and footballer. The first female football pundit at a World Cup for the BBC, the first female pundit on Sky Sports Super Sunday, and the first female to be a permanent presenter of Football Focus
 Chris Smalling (born 1989), footballer
 Dina Asher Smith, sprinter
 Louis Smith (born 1989), retired gymnast
 Djed Spence (born 2000), footballer
 Dujon Sterling, footballer
 Raheem Sterling, footballer
 Worrell Sterling, retired football player
 Daniel Sturridge (born 1989), footballer
 Andros Townsend (born 1991), footballer
 Theo Walcott (born 1989), footballer for Everton FC
 Kyle Walker, footballer
 Dillian Whyte (born 1988), boxer
 Ian Wright (born 1963), retired footballer
 Ashley Young (born 1985), footballer
 Reece James

Writing and journalism
 Trish Adudu (born 1969), journalist, newsreader and TV presenter
 Akala (born 1983), journalist, author, activist and poet 
 Raymond Antrobus (born 1986), poet, educator and writer. The first poet to win the Rathbones Folio Prize for his collection The Perseverance 
 Barbara Blake-Hannah (born 1941), author and Journalist. British television's first black on-camera reporter and interviewer
 Valerie Bloom (born 1956), author and poet
 Syd Burke (died 2010), broadcaster, journalist and photographer
 Candice Carty-Williams (born 1989), writer and author. She was the first black woman to win the British Book Awards "Book of the Year" accolade for her novel Queenie
 Lady Colin Campbell (born 1949), author and socialite
 Patricia Cumper (born 1954), playwright, producer, director, theatre administrator, critic and commentator.
 Ferdinand Dennis (born 1956), writer, broadcaster, journalist and lecturer
 Salena Godden, broadcaster, author, activist, memoirist and essayist.
 Colin Grant (born 1961), author
 Victor Headley (born 1959), author and producer
 Ben Hunte, journalist and reporter
 Linton Kwesi Johnson (born 1952), poet and activist
 Darren Jordon, journalist
 Andrea Levy (died 2019), author, the first writer of colour whose pen would join the Royal Society of Literature's historic collection
 Una Marson (died 1965), writer, producer of plays and radio programmes. She was the first black female radio producer at the BBC
 Clive Myrie (born 1964), journalist, newsreader and TV presenter
 Zadie Smith (born 1975), author
 Vivian Virtue (died 1998), translator and broadcaster 
 Charlene White (born 1980), journalist, newsreader and TV presenter
 Kerry Young (born 1955), author
 Benjamin Zephaniah (born 1958), author and dub poet

Others 

 Fay Allen (died 2021), first black woman police constable in the United Kingdom
 Vanley Burke (born 1951), photographer and artist
 Sergeant William Robinson Clarke (died1981), World War I airman who was the first black pilot to fly for Britain
 Joe Clough (died 1976), first Black bus driver in London
 Yvonne Conolly (died 2021), Britain's first female black headteacher
 Kevin Fenton (born 1966), epidemiologist and a regional director at Public Health England.
 Wilston Samuel Jackson, fireman and Britain's first black train driver
 George "Fowokan" Kelly (born 1943), sculptor
 Errol Lloyd (born 1943), artist, writer, art critic, editor and arts administrator
 Ludlow Moody (died 1981), doctor
 Ronald Moody (died 1984), sculptor. Moody crater on Mercury was named after him in November 2008
 Mary Seacole (died 1881), nurse and businesswoman. Voted the greatest black Briton

Fictional characters
 Lee Jordan, fictional character

See also
 List of Jamaicans
 List of Jamaican Americans

References

Jamaican
Jamaican British
 
British